Mary Ann or Maryann or Mary Anne may refer to:

People
 Mary Ann Booth (1843–1922), American microscopist
 Mary Ann Cunningham (1841-1930), Canadian temperance activist
 Mary Ann Hanmer Dodd (1813-1878), American poet
 Mary Ann Hilliard (1860-1950), Irish nurse and suffragette
 Mary Anne Hobbs (born 1964), BBC Radio 6 DJ
 Mary Ann Lee (1824-1899), American ballerina
 Mary Ann Lyth (1811-1890), British missionary, translator, teacher
 Mary Ann Magnin (1850–1943), co-founder of I. Magnin, an upscale women's clothing store in San Francisco, California.
 Mary Ann Nichols (1845–1888), victim of Jack the Ripper
 Mary Ann Turcke, President, Bell Media, Canada
 Mary-Anne Williams, Australian thought leader on innovation, computer scientist, roboticist, and AI researcher
 Mary Ann Weitnauer, American electrical engineer

Music
 Mary Ann Acevedo (born 1987), Puerto Rican singer and songwriter
 Mary-Ann, original name of the Finnish gothic metal band To/Die/For
 Mary Ann (album), 2006 debut album of Mary Ann Acevedo

Songs
 "Mary Ann" (Black Lace song), 1979
 "Mary Ann" (Ray Charles song), 1956
 "Mary Anne" (song), a 1982 song by Marshall Crenshaw
 "Mary Ann", a 1928 song written by Abner Silver and Benny Davis
 "Mary Ann", a song by Alice Cooper from the 1973 album Billion Dollar Babies
 "Mary Ann", a song by Bob Dylan from the 1973 album Dylan
 "Mary Ann", a circa 1945 calypso attributed to Roaring Lion (Rafael de Leon) later popularized as Marianne (Terry Gilkyson song)
 "Mary Ann", a 1973 song by Vladimir Vysotsky
 "Mary Ann Limbo", a 1963 song written by William H Eaton Jr and performed by Chubby Checker
"Mary Anne", a song by Anjan Dutt from the 1995 album Purono Guitar
 "Mary Ann", a 1975 song by Andy Kim
 "Mary Anne", a song by Jerry Lordan, recorded by The Shadows
 "Mary Ann", a song by Regina Spektor from the album 11:11

Film, television and literature
 Mary Ann Summers, fictional character on the U.S. TV series Gilligan's Island
 Mary Anne (novel), a 1954 novel by Daphne du Maurier
 Mary Ann (film), a 1918 Hungarian silent drama film
 Marianne, a female personification of France
 Mary Anne Spier, a fictional character in Ann M. Martin's The Baby-Sitters Club series.

Other
 Battle of FSB Mary Ann, a Vietnam War battle
 Mary Anne, a caravan of wagons carrying a stove, food, tents, blankets and tools to support a log drive
 Mary-Ann (turbine generator), a steam turbine electric generator installed by Hartford Electric Light Company in 1901
 Mary Anne, one of four ships hired by the New Zealand Company in 1841
 Mary Ann (1772), whaling and convict ship
 Maryann (yacht), a yacht requisitioned and converted by the United States Navy during the defense of the Philippines in World War II

Fictional characters
Mary Ann Patterson, a character from the Ghost Whisperer

See also
 Marianne (disambiguation)
 Maryanne, given name